Sepolia is a station on Athens Metro Line 2. It was named after the neighbourhood Sepolia, where it is located. It opened on 28 January 2000 and served as the original northern terminus of Line 2 until  opened in August 2004.

References

Athens Metro stations
Railway stations opened in 2000
2000 establishments in Greece